Matthew Alton Cartwright (born May 1, 1961) is an American politician and lawyer serving as the U.S. representative from Pennsylvania's 8th congressional district since 2013. The district, numbered as the 17th district from 2013 through 2019, includes a large swath of northeastern Pennsylvania, anchored by Scranton, Wilkes-Barre and the Poconos. A member of the Democratic Party, Cartwright defeated 10-term incumbent Tim Holden, the dean of Pennsylvania's congressional delegation, in the Democratic primary on April 24, 2012, 57%–43%. He then defeated Republican nominee Laureen Cummings in the general election on November 6, 2012, 61%–39%. As an attorney, Cartwright previously worked at the law firm of Munley, Munley, and Cartwright.

Early life and education
Cartwright was born on May 1, 1961, in Erie, Pennsylvania, the son of Alton S. Cartwright and Adelaide (Igoe) Cartwright. He attended Upper Canada College (Toronto), graduating in 1979, before earning a magna cum laude Bachelor of Arts Degree in history from Hamilton College in 1983, where he graduated Phi Beta Kappa. Cartwright studied law at the University of Pennsylvania Law School.

He served two years as an editor of the University of Pennsylvania Law Review and received his Juris Doctor degree in 1986. In 1981, Cartwright attended the London School of Economics, where he met his future wife, Marion Munley. After graduating from law school, Cartwright worked as an associate in the litigation department of the Philadelphia law firm Montgomery, McCracken, Walker & Rhoads, practicing commercial and securities litigation. In 1988, both Munley and Cartwright joined the Munley family's law firm in the Scranton area.

Legal career
For 24 years, Cartwright worked as an attorney and partner at Munley, Munley and Cartwright, a Scranton firm representing victims, consumers and small businesses in personal and business litigation. He was admitted to the Pennsylvania Bar in 1986 and in 2005 was further admitted to the Bar of New York. In 2008, Cartwright was inducted into the International Society of Barristers.

Cartwright served from 2009 to 2012 as a member of the Board of Governors of the American Association for Justice. Between 2005 and 2011, Cartwright was the on-air legal analyst for The Law & You. In the segment, aired nightly as part of NBC affiliate WBRE-TV's evening newscast, he fielded viewer questions on legal matters. In 2011, Cartwright co-authored the legal treatise Litigating Commercial and Business Tort Cases published by Thomson Reuters.

During the 1992 presidential election, Cartwright was an elected delegate for Bill Clinton at the Democratic National Convention, representing Pennsylvania's 10th congressional district. In 2001–2002, he served as District Governor for Rotary International District 7410, covering northeastern Pennsylvania. On November 5, 2010, the Boy Scouts of America's Northeastern Pennsylvania Council presented Cartwright with its Silver Beaver Award for volunteer service to that organization.

U.S. House of Representatives

Elections
2012

Pennsylvania Republicans, who controlled the redistricting process after the 2010 United States Census, significantly altered Holden's 17th district. The old 17th had been based in Harrisburg, but the new 17th had been pushed well to the north and east. In the process, it absorbed heavily Democratic Scranton and Wilkes-Barre, previously in the 11th district. The remap significantly altered the 17th's demographics. The old 17th had been anchored in traditionally Republican territory in central Pennsylvania; in much of the district, Holden was the only elected Democrat above the county level. John McCain carried it with 51 percent of the vote. In contrast, the new 17th was anchored in northeastern Pennsylvania, which had long been the most Democratic region of the state outside of Philadelphia and Pittsburgh. Had the district existed in 2008, Barack Obama would have carried it with 56 percent of the vote.

An internal poll from Cartwright showed him up seven points against Holden, the incumbent. The new district was significantly bluer than its predecessor and was located in territory where constituents were unfamiliar with Holden. The only portion of the district that had been in the old 17th was Holden's home in Schuylkill County, Pennsylvania, with the majority of Democratic primary voters located in counties considered more favorable to Cartwright's candidacy. During the primary, Cartwright described himself as being from "the Democratic wing of the Democratic Party"—a line often employed by Howard Dean and Paul Wellstone. He was supported by MoveOn.org, the League of Conservation Voters, and the Campaign for Primary Accountability. Cartwright ran as a self-professed "FDR Democrat", and as an ally of President Obama on taxes and health care reform, and pledged to work with U.S. Senator Robert P. Casey Jr., also of Scranton, on regulations for safety in fracking. Cartwright also benefited in the race from endorsements from popular local public figures like State Representative Phyllis Mundy and former Scranton mayor Jimmy Connors. Holden's opposition to the Patient Protection and Affordable Care Act and his support of energy legislation that included the Halliburton loophole are believed to have contributed to his defeat. On April 24, 2012, Cartwright defeated Holden by 57%–43% in the primary.

In the November general election, Cartwright faced Republican nurse Laureen Cummings, a leader of the Scranton Tea Party. On November 6, Cartwright defeated Cummings, 61%–39% to become the district's next congressman.

On January 4, 2013, Cartwright was selected by his peers to serve as a class president of the 49 new Democratic members of the 113th Congress.

2014

On November 4, 2014, Cartwright won a second term, defeating Republican challenger David Moylan, M.D., the elected Coroner of Schuylkill County, by 13.6 points.

2016

On November 8, 2016, Cartwright won a third term, defeating Republican challenger Matthew Connolly, a businessman from Northampton County, by seven points.

2018

In the 2016 general election, President Donald Trump won the 17th district by over 10% in the concurrent presidential election. Facing an underfunded opponent, Cartwright did not run television advertisements. That year, Cartwright won re-election by only seven points, representing his lowest margin of victory. As a result, the National Republican Congressional Committee began to see Cartwright as potentially vulnerable, and listed him as a top target. In response, the Democratic Congressional Campaign Committee included him on its "frontline" list. Despite this, the district was rated as Likely D, meaning it was expected that Cartwright would win re-election.

After the Supreme Court of Pennsylvania threw out Pennsylvania's previous congressional map, Cartwright's district was renumbered as the 8th district. It was pushed to the north and now covers the northeast corner of the state, but it also sweeps west to grab Scranton and Wilkes-Barre. In the process, it absorbed the remainder of Lackawanna County previously in the 10th district, as well as almost all of Luzerne County.

In the election, Cartwright faced a self-funding opponent who spent $1.7 million of his family's money in the race, in total outspending Cartwright by nearly $300,000, including direct expenditures of $625,778 by the NRCC.

Cartwright won his fourth term by 9.3% with 54.65% of the vote without financial assistance from the DCCC.

Following the general election, Cartwright was elected to House Democratic leadership, to serve as Co-chair of the Democratic Policy and Communications Committee for the 116th Congress in the House Democratic Caucus elections.

2020

On November 3, 2020, despite Donald Trump again carrying his district, Cartwright won a fifth term, defeating Republican challenger Jim Bognet, the former senior vice president for communications of the Export–Import Bank of the United States, by 3.6 points. In contrast, Trump won the district against Democratic challenger and Scranton native Joe Biden by 4.4 points during the concurrent presidential election. At 8%, Cartwright's 2020 victory represented the largest over-performance by a Democrat in Pennsylvania compared to the presidential result, and the second largest for a Democratic win in a district Trump carried in the entire House, only behind Jared Golden of Maine. As a result, Cartwright became one of only seven incumbent Democratic Representatives in the U.S. House to win their seats despite Trump prevailing over Biden in them. He also was one of only three Democrats in the U.S. House to defend their seats successfully despite Donald Trump winning their districts twice.

Following the general election, Cartwright was re-elected to House Democratic leadership, to serve as Co-chair of the Democratic Policy and Communications Committee for the 117th Congress in the 2020 United States House of Representatives Democratic Caucus leadership elections.

On January 25, 2021, Cartwright was elected Chairman of the House Appropriations Subcommittee on Commerce, Justice and Science and Related Agencies.

2022

Cartwright ran for reelection in 2022 in a rematch against Bognet. Cartwright won the election by 2.4 points.

In the lead-up to the election, the 8th District's race was seen as potentially determining whether or not the Democratic Party would maintain control of the U.S. House of Representatives. Cartwright did win his race, but Democrats ultimately lost their majority in the House.

In 2022, Cartwright appeared in advertisements praising one of his top donor's law firm in what Axios described as "an apparent misunderstanding over video shot for the Pennsylvania Democrat's bill about water contamination at Camp Lejeune." Members of Congress are not allowed to use official resources to promote commercial activity. Cartwright sent a cease and desist letter to the law firm, which took down the ads.

Outside spending on behalf of Jim Bognet in the 2020 race totalled $383,105, when Bognet lost by 3.6%. In the 2022 race, outside spending amassed on behalf of Bognet reached $7,267,960, and he lost by 2.4%.

Enacted Legislation

HR 4904 (114th Congress) The MEGABYTE Act of 2016
signed by President Barack Obama, July 29, 2016
HR 3122 (115th Congress) The Veterans Care Financial Protection Act of 2017
signed by President Donald Trump, March 9, 2018
HR 1701 (115th Congress) The EGO Act
signed by President Donald Trump, March 27, 2018
HR 4963 (115th Congress) The Amy, Vicky and Andy Child Pornography Victim Assistance Act of 2018, enacted via S.2152
signed by President Donald Trump, December 7, 2018
HR 762  (116th Congress) The Streamlining Energy Efficiency for Schools Act, enacted via HR 133
signed by President Donald Trump, December 27, 2020
HR 4505 (117th Congress) Commerce, Justice, Science and Related Agencies Appropriations Act of 2022, enacted via HR 2471
signed by President Joseph Biden, March 15, 2022
HR 6482 (117th Congress) The Camp Lejeune Justice Act of 2022, enacted via S.3373
signed by President Joseph Biden, August 10, 2022
HR 8256 (117th Congress) Commerce Justice, Science and Related Agencies Appropriations Act of 2023, enacted via HR 2617
signed by President Joseph Biden, December 29, 2022
HR 9468 (117th Congress) To extend the authority to reimburse members of the armed services for spouse relicensing costs pursuant to a permanent change of station, enacted via HR 7776
signed by President Joseph Biden, December 23, 2022
HR 9617 (117th Congress) To amend the Delaware Water Gap National Recreation Area Improvement Act to extend the exception for certain roads, enacted via HR 2617
signed by President Joseph Biden, December 29, 2022
HR 9618 (117th Congress) The STREAM Act, enacted via HR 2617
signed by President Joseph Biden, December 29, 2022
HR 9619 (117th Congress) to establish a pilot program for native plant species, and for other purposes, enacted via HR 2617
signed by President Joseph Biden, December 29, 2022

Committee assignments

Committee on Appropriations
Subcommittee on Commerce, Justice and Science (Ranking Member)
Subcommittee on Financial Services and General Government

House Democratic Committee on Steering and Policy
Elected representative for Pennsylvania, Ohio, Kentucky and West Virginia

Caucuses
Congressional Progressive Caucus
House Military Depot and Industrial Facilities Caucus 
Sustainable Energy and Environment Coalition Caucus 
United States Congressional International Conservation Caucus 
Veterinary Medicine Caucus  
Climate Solutions Caucus
Blue Collar Caucus
House Pro-Choice Caucus

Political positions

Healthcare
Ed O'Keefe of the Washington Post wrote on November 3, 2013, that Cartwright was elected largely based on the Affordable Care Act "because the veteran moderate Democrat he challenged in a primary voted against it." According to O'Keefe, "Cartwright spent his first year in office preparing constituents for 'the ACA'."

In May 2017, Cartwright voted against the Republican-sponsored American Health Care Act. Cartwright said in January 2018 that he continued to support the Affordable Care Act. Cartwright also supports Medicare for All.

Immigration
In July 2015, Cartwright voted against a bill that would have withdrawn funding from municipalities that declined to detain undocumented persons for the Immigration and Customs Enforcement service. In June 2017, Cartwright was one of three Democrats who joined the 228–195 majority voting to cut off some particular federal grants from cities not agreeing to detentions. He voted for "Kate's Law", to increase criminal punishment for illegal immigrant recidivist violent criminals. He co-sponsored legislation to protect the "Dreamers", people who entered the country illegally as children. When Trump ordered a temporary limit on immigration from certain countries, Cartwright criticized the order.

Technology
Cartwright supports net neutrality.

Economic issues

Cartwright has criticized the Trump tax cut, saying that it gave taxpayers little relief while adding huge sums to the national debt.

Environment

On February 26, 2014, Cartwright introduced the Streamlining Energy Efficiency for Schools Act of 2014 (H.R. 4092; 113th Congress), a bill that would require the United States Department of Energy to establish a centralized clearinghouse to disseminate information on federal programs, incentives, and mechanisms for financing energy-efficient retrofits and upgrades at schools. Cartwright argued that "the bill is a strategic and cost-saving investment to relieve the fiscal pressure felt by schools across the country while bringing us closer to energy security." Cartwright's bill passed unanimously out of the Energy and Commerce Committee on April 30, 2014. It passed the full House of Representatives on June 23, 2014.

Gun policy
During his first month in office he co-sponsored four bills involving gun control. He opposes gun-makers' legal immunity after a crime has occurred, and he opposes assault rifle sales.

In 2022, Cartwright voted for H.R. 1808: Assault Weapons Ban of 2022.

LGBT stance
Cartwright has said, "there's no reason to discriminate against gay people". He does not believe religious leaders should be mandated to perform same-sex wedding ceremonies.

Student loans
In October 2018, Cartwright co-authored a Washington Post article proposing a pilot program to examine the effectiveness of non-transferable financial incentives such as certain student loan forgiveness being given to increase organ donation.

Transportation
Cartwright has pushed for re-establishing a passenger rail line between Northeastern Pennsylvania and New York City, which was last operated in the early 1970s with Erie Lackawanna Railway's Phoebe Snow Passenger Service. This restoration would use funds from the Infrastructure Investment and Jobs Act, also known as the INVEST in America Act.

Joe Biden
As of August 2022, Cartwright had voted in line with Joe Biden's stated position 100% of the time.

Marjorie Taylor Greene
Cartwright cosponsored a resolution to expel Georgia Republican Rep. Marjorie Taylor Greene from Congress, suggesting that she "advocated violence against our peers, the Speaker and our government."

Eminent domain
In 2014, Cartwright voted against H.R. 1944: The Private Property Rights Protection Act of 2014, a law that limits the use of eminent domain by state governments.

Syria
In 2013, Cartwright voted in favor of intervention and arming the Syrian Opposition against Bashar al-Assad and ISIS.

In 2023, Cartwright voted against H.Con.Res. 21 which directed President Joe Biden to remove U.S. troops from Syria within 180 days.

COVID-19 policy
On January 31, 2023, Cartwright voted against H.R.497:Freedom for Health Care Workers Act, a bill which would lift COVID-19 vaccine mandates for healthcare workers.

On February 1, 2023, Cartwright voted against a resolution to end COVID-19 national emergency.

Electoral history

Personal life
Cartwright married Marion K. Munley on August 10, 1985, in Archbald, Pennsylvania. They live in Moosic, Pennsylvania, with their two sons. Cartwright is Roman Catholic.

References

External links

 Congressman Matt Cartwright official U.S. House website
 Matt Cartwright for Congress

|-

|-

1961 births
21st-century American politicians
Hamilton College (New York) alumni
Catholics from Pennsylvania
Left-wing populism in the United States
Living people
Pennsylvania lawyers
Democratic Party members of the United States House of Representatives from Pennsylvania
People from Lackawanna County, Pennsylvania
University of Pennsylvania Law School alumni
American gun control activists
American Roman Catholics